Fuzhou railway station is a railway station on the Xiangtang–Putian railway located in Fuzhou, Jiangxi, People's Republic of China.

References

Railway stations in Jiangxi
Fuzhou, Jiangxi
Railway stations in China opened in 2013